Jami-Ann Kranich (born May 27, 1992) is an American soccer coach and former player from Hamden, Connecticut, who is currently an assistant coach with the Boston College Eagles women's soccer team.

Early life
Born on May 27, 1992, in New Haven, Connecticut, to James and Nancy Kranich, she played high school soccer at Hamden High School, where she started three seasons, and played club soccer for Connecticut Football Club.

Playing career

College
Kranich attended Villanova University, where she played as a goalkeeper for the Wildcats. Kranich had 12 shutouts in 64 appearances for the Wildcats.

International
Kranich has appeared with the United States national U-20 soccer team, and was a member of the 2012 championship team at the FIFA U-20 Women's World Cup.

Club

Boston Breakers, 2014–2016
Kranich was selected in the fourth round of the 2014 National Women's Soccer League college entry draft by the Boston Breakers.

Jami recorded her first professional shutout against the Portland Thorns May 16, 2015.  The Breakers waived Kranich on April 5, 2016. Boston re-signed her in May 2016 to replace  keeper Abby Smith, who tore her ACL early in the season.

Awards and honors

College 
Big East Goalkeeper of the Week (Oct. 22, 2012), Villanova.

Third Team All-Big East Team: 2012, Villanova.

Country 
2012 FIFA U-20 Women's World Cup Champion,  U.S. Women's U-20 National Team.

See also

References

External links 
 Boston Breakers player profile
 Villanova player profile
 Quinnipiac coaching interview
 Princeton coaching profile
 Boston College coaching profile
 

1992 births
Living people
American women's soccer players
National Women's Soccer League players
Boston Breakers players
Villanova Wildcats women's soccer players
People from Hamden, Connecticut
Soccer players from Connecticut
Women's association football goalkeepers
Boston Breakers draft picks
United States women's under-20 international soccer players
Boston College Eagles women's soccer coaches
Princeton Tigers women's soccer coaches
High school soccer coaches in the United States
Quinnipiac Bobcats women's soccer coaches